John Rowan (born September 18, 1945) is an American Vietnam War veteran and the sixth national president of the Vietnam Veterans of America (VVA).

Early life, education and military service
Rowan was born on September 18, 1945, in Queens, New York City. He was educated at the Brooklyn Technical High School, and he attended Baruch College but did not graduate. Instead, he learned Indonesian at the Defense Language Institute and Vietnamese in Washington, D.C., before serving in the Vietnam War.

In 1967, in the midst of the Vietnam War, Rowan joined the U.S. Air Force Security Service as a linguist. He "flew in planes over North Vietnam with a team listening in on the enemy's communications and translating them into English to guide or warn American pilots."

After the war, Rowan attended Queen's College, where he earned a bachelor's degree in Political Science. He attended graduate school at Hunter College, where he earned a master's degree in Urban Affairs.

Career and civic activities
Rowan spent his career in the public sector. He was an investigator for the New York City Comptroller's Office until 2002.

Rowan became a member of the Council of Vietnam Veterans, later known as the Vietnam Veterans of America, in 1978. He was a founding member of its chapter in Queens, New York in 1981. From 1995 to 2005, he was the president of the VVA's New York State Council from 1995 to 2005. Since 2005, he has served as its sixth national president. He has raised awareness about the high rate of PTSD among Vietnam War veterans. He has also worked with the Vietnamese Veterans Association to find missing U.S. veterans of the war who died on Vietnamese soil.

Rowan serves on the advisory board of the New York City Department of Veterans' Affairs, where he represents Queens.

Personal life
With his wife Mariann, Rowan resides in Middle Village, New York.

References

External links
John Rowan on C-SPAN
Vietnam Veterans of America

Living people
1945 births
People from Queens, New York
Brooklyn Technical High School alumni
Queens College, City University of New York alumni
Hunter College alumni
United States Air Force personnel of the Vietnam War
United States Air Force airmen